The Boston Fire Department provides fire protection and first responder emergency medical services to the city of Boston, Massachusetts. It also responds to such incidents as motor vehicle accidents, hazardous material spills, utility mishaps, floods, explosions, and construction accidents.

The Boston Fire Department was established as the first paid fire department in the United States, and is the largest municipal fire department in New England serving approximately 685,000 people living in the  area of the city proper. Additionally, it actively participates in MetroFire, the fire services mutual aid system which serves it and 35 other fire departments in the surrounding area.

In and around Boston, firefighters are sometimes referred to as Jakes.

History

1631−1678 
The Boston Fire Department traces its roots back to 1631, a year after the city was founded, when the first fire ordinance was adopted.  In what then was the Massachusetts Bay Colony of the Kingdom of England, the city banned thatched roofs and wooden chimneys. However, it wasn't until 1653 that the first hand engine was appropriated to provide pressure for water lines.

1678−1837 
In 1678, the city founded a paid fire department, and hired Thomas Atkins to be the first fire chief. On February 1, 1711, the town appointed a group of Fire Wards, each responsible for the operation and maintenance of equipment assigned to a region of the city.  The grandfather of Herman Melville, Thomas Melvill, served as a town fire ward from 1779 to 1825; his great-grandfather, Allen Melvill, served as a firefighter from 1733 to 1761. It was not until 1799 that the first leather fire hose was used, after being imported from England.

1837−1910 

The department underwent its first reorganization in 1837 when the hand engine department reorganized, reducing the number of active engines to fourteen.  By December 31, 1858, the department had 14 hand engines, 3 hook and ladder carriages, and 6 hydrant (hose) carriages. On November 1, 1859, Engine Co. 8 began service as the first steam engine in the department.  The reorganization of 1859-60 replaced the department's 14 hand engines with 11 new steam engines. The organizational structure of the department, as it still exists today, developed in that same period.

The department was the first in the world to utilize the telegraph to alert fire fighters of an emergency, installing the system in 1851.  The first fire alarm was transmitted via the fire alarm telegraph system on April 29, 1852. The famous Boston fire of 1872 led to the appointment of a board of fire commissioners.  The Boston Fire Department also provided assistance in the Great Chelsea Fire of 1908 and the Great Salem Fire of 1914. The department purchased its first steam fireboat in 1873, and installed fire poles in the stations in 1881.

Equipment changes, 1910−present 
On July 29, 1910, the department purchased its first motorized apparatus.  From 1914 until 1923, horse drawn engines as well as steam and motorized engine companies were in use in Boston.  Ladder 24 was the last company to replace its horses in 1923 when it became motorized.  In 1925, the last fire horses were retired.  It wasn't until 1926 that the last steam engine was converted to a motorized engine.  The department first started using radio communication in 1925, installing radios in the fireboats, chiefs' cars, and rescue companies.

By 1960, the department operated 48 engines, 29 ladders, 1 rescue, and 2 fireboats. By the end of the decade, the standard  ladder trucks were replaced by  aerial ladders with tillers.

In the 1970s, the department experimented with lime-green colored apparatus, but reverted to the traditional red in 1984, when the department made the switch to E-One fire apparatus. In the early 1980s, an arson ring caused over 600 fires, many reaching multiple-alarm status.  The group was ultimately caught and convicted.

Also in the early 1980s, the department experienced a dramatic number of cutbacks due to budget cuts. The number of Engine Companies dropped from 43 to 33, the Fire Brigade was disbanded (only to be reopened in the mid-80's), the number of Ladder Companies went from 28 to 21, and one of the two Tower Companies was disbanded and reduced to a regular Ladder Company (bringing the total to 22 Ladder Companies). Rescue 2 was disbanded, but reorganized in 1986.

2007 Boston bomb scare

On January 31, 2007, the department, Boston Police, and the United States Department of Homeland Security removed LED advertisements resembling the mooninite characters of the Cartoon Network show Aqua Teen Hungerforce for its movie which had premiered at the time, Aqua teen hunger force colon movie film for theaters. The advertisements, dispersed throughout the city by two individuals  hired by Turner Broadcasting, Interference, Inc., and Cartoon Network, were mistaken for homemade explosives. A civil settlement was eventually reached with Turner, Interference, and Cartoon Network for some portion of the costs incurred by Boston Police and Department of Homeland Security in responding to the events. One of Cartoon Network's managerial staff also resigned in the aftermath.

2013 Boston Marathon Bombing 
On June 3, 2013, Chief Steve Abraira resigned citing public criticism from his deputies over his response to the Boston Marathon bombing.

Harassment and gender and racial imbalance 

After sexual harassment complaints by several women, the Boston Fire Department agreed to improve conditions for women under the terms of the 1996 Hansford Decree, including providing gender-separated bathrooms and sleeping areas.

In 2018, firefighter David Sanchez sexually assaulted a fellow firefighter in a firehouse on Centre Street in Jamaica Plain. The victim, Nathalie Fontanez, later commented that the other men in the firehouse sided with the assailant, that she had been hazed and discriminated against because she was female and Latina, and that she had been retaliated against for reporting sexually inappropriate behavior. She cited the example of being denied a transfer to the Fire Investigation Unit on the grounds it was for more senior firefighters, only to see the job go to a white man who started in the department on the same day. The city reached a $3.2 million settlement for the complaint and launched a retraining initiative. Other female firefighters also reported inappropriate comments, theft of equipment, finding their beds urinated in, inappropriate use of a cell phone app to locate an off-duty female firefighter, fears of being video recorded while naked, and a sexual assault that resulted in no disciplinary action.

The Boston Globe reported that in 2018, out of about 1,500 firefighters, only 16 were women of whom 12 were African American or Hispanic. The City of Boston was estimated to be 23% African American and 20% Hispanic in 2017.

Organization
The Boston Fire Department has six divisions:
Fire Suppression and rescue services
The most visible division of the department, this division provides the fire protection and rescue services for the city of Boston with uniformed firefighters being dispatched to and responding to a variety of emergencies. The services provided include firefighting, first responder emergency medical services, hazardous materials response,  vehicle extrication and other services.  The department operates engine companies, ladder companies, and rescue companies, and several special units each providing distinctly separate services at a fire or other emergency. These companies and units are under the command of two Divisions commanding ten districts.
Fire Prevention
This division is responsible for maintaining records, granting permits, conducting public education, and inspecting buildings. 
Training
This division supervises the development of the fire fighters from probation to retirement.  Also, the division conducts research to improve techniques and equipment, evaluating new tools before their implementation.  The Emergency Medical Services and the Safety Operations Unit are also within this division.
Personnel
This division includes the Administration Section, Selection Unit, Medical Office, Personnel Assignments of Officer’s Section, and the Employees Assistant Program.  The division keeps the records of each fire fighter, communicates with other departments, unions, and agencies, and hears grievances, disciplinary hearings, and appeals.
Emergency Planning and Preparedness
This division was established in 1996 to replace the Special Services Division, providing the city with an Incident Command System, Office of Emergency Management, and Local Emergency Planning Committee.
Special Operations Command
This division was established in 2001 with a goal of recommending training, deployment and equipment for the Boston Fire Department in all areas of rescue services including technical rescue, CBRNE/hazardous materials operations as well as Dive Team and Marine Unit operations.

Fire Commissioners
Henry S. Russell: 1895–1905
Patrick J. Kennedy (acting): 1905
Benjamin W. Wells: 1905–1908
Samuel D. Parker: 1908–1910
Francis M. Carroll (acting): 1910
Charles Dudley Daly: 1910–1912
John H. Dunn (acting): 1912
Charles H. Cole: 1912–1914
John M. Minton (acting): 1914
John Grady: 1914–1919
John R. Murphy: 1919–1921
Joseph P. Manning (acting): 1921–1922
William J. Casey  (acting): 1922
Theodore A. Glynn: 1922–1926
Thomas F. Sullivan (acting): 1926
Eugene Hultman: 1926–1930
Edward F. McLaughlin: 1930–1933
Eugene M. McSweeney: 1933–1934
Edward F. McLaughlin: 1934–1938
William Arthur Reilly: 1938–1945
John I. Fitzgerald: 1945–1946
Russell S. Codman Jr.: 1946–1950
Michael T. Kelleher: 1950–1953
John F. Cotter: 1953–1954
Francis X. Cotter: 1954–1959
Timothy J. O'Connor: 1959–1960
Henry Scagnoli: 1960–1961
Thomas Griffin: 1961–1966
Henry A. Scagnoli (acting):  1966
William J. Fitzgerald: 1966–1968
James H. Kelly: 1968–1975
George Paul: 1975–1985
Leo Stapleton: 1984–1991
Martin E. Pierce Jr.: 1991–2000
Dennis DiMarzio (acting): 2000–2001
Paul Christian: 2001–2006
Kevin P. MacCurtain (acting): 2006
Roderick Fraser: 2006–2014
John Hasson (acting): 2014
Joseph E. Finn: 2014–2020
John Dempsey: 2020–2022
Paul Burke: 2022–present

Firehouses and apparatus

The Boston Fire Department operates two Divisions and is split into ten Districts total. Division 1 is responsible for the northern part of Boston and is split into five districts (Districts 1, 3, 4, 6 and 11) while Division 2 commands the southern five districts (Districts 7, 8, 9, 10 and 12). Each Division is commanded by a Deputy Chief and each District is commanded by a District Chief, similar to a Battalion chief, who supervises 3-5 or more firehouses and their respective fire companies and units. There is also a Safety Chief, a district chief, who serves citywide as the Incident Safety Officer at fires and large-scale incidents.

The Marine Unit of the BFD is located at Burrough's Wharf in the North End and houses the 3 Fireboats or Marine Units. The Marine Unit responds to approximately 500−600 emergency calls annually. The Boston Fire Department also operates a High-Pressure Pumping Station at 175 Kneeland St. in Downtown and contains 17 miles of underground piping throughout the Downtown area. The system can provide pressurized water to the many pressurized fire hydrants in the Downtown area.

In addition to the firehouses, the BFD also operates a Special Operations Command/Haz-Mat. Facility at 108 Holton St. in Brighton, a Communications/Fire Alarm Dispatch Center at 1 Fenway in Roxbury, and an Administrative Headquarters/Motor Pool Facility at 115 Southampton St. in Roxbury. The Fire Academy is located on Moon Island.

Radio call signs
Each division within the Boston Fire Department utilizes a series of alphabetical radio call signs to designate each unit within a certain division.

Notable Fires

Great Fire of 1760 

The first "Great Fire" of Boston destroyed 349 buildings on March 20, 1760.

Great Fire of 1872 

The second "Great Fire" of Boston began on November 9, 1872.  The fire destroyed 776 buildings, killed 13 people, and caused $75,000,000 in property damage.  The fire required mutual aid companies from as far away as New Haven, Connecticut and Manchester, New Hampshire.

Arcadia Hotel fire 

The Arcadia Hotel fire occurred on December 3, 1913, in a flophouse on the corner of Washington and Laconia Streets in Boston's South End. The fire killed 28 persons, making it the deadliest in Boston at that time, passing the Great Boston Fire of 1872.

Cocoanut Grove Fire 

The Cocoanut Grove fire was the second-deadliest single-building fire in American history. At 10:15 PM on November 28, 1942, the fire began when a short in the electrical wiring ignited gas leaking from a faulty refrigeration unit. The fire eventually claimed 490 lives, and injured 166 more. Only the 1903 Iroquois Theatre fire in Chicago had a higher death toll at 605.

Paramount Hotel fire 

On January 28, 1966, a series of explosions under the Paramount Hotel and resulting fires killed 11 people and damaged multiple buildings. Boston Municipal Court Judge Elijah Adlow blamed the blast on a leak from a gas main.

Vendome Hotel Fire 

At 2:35 PM on Saturday, June 17, 1972, an alarm from Box 1571 was received for the Hotel Vendome on Commonwealth Avenue in the Back Bay. It took nearly three hours to get the 4-alarm blaze under control. At 5:28 PM, during overhaul operations, the southeast section of the building unexpectedly collapsed. The collapse killed 9 Boston firefighters: Lieutenant Thomas J. Carroll (Engine 32), Lieutenant John E. Hanbury (Ladder 13), Firefighter Richard B. Magee (Engine 33), Firefighter Joseph F. Boucher (Engine 22), Firefighter Paul J. Murphy (Engine 32), Firefighter John E. Jameson (Engine 22), Firefighter Charles E. Dolan (Ladder 13), Firefighter Joseph P. Saniuk (Ladder 13) and Firefighter Thomas W. Beckwith (Engine 32); and injured 8 more. This fire was the worst tragedy in the history of the Boston Fire Department and one of the most deadly fires in the history of U.S. firefighting.

Beacon Street Fire 

On the afternoon of March 26, 2014, firefighters responded to a report of a fire in a Beacon Street brownstone in Boston's Back Bay. It was reported that smoke was observed upon arrival. Shortly after crews entered the building, a mayday alarm was sounded as members of Engine 33 became trapped in the basement. Two firefighters, Lieutenant Edward Walsh of Engine Company 33 and Michael Kennedy of Ladder Company 15, were killed and 18 people were injured in this nine alarm fire.

See also
 Boston Society of Vulcans
 Boston Police Department

References

External links

Boston Fire Department Official Website
Boston Fire Department Local 718 Union Website
List of Boston Fire Boxes and Locations
Boston Fire Historical Society

Government of Boston
Fire departments in Massachusetts